The Samurai is a novel by Japanese author Shusaku Endo first published in 1980. It tells a fictionalized story of a 17th-century diplomatic mission to "Nueva España" (New Spain or Mexico) by Japanese noblemen, and the cultural clash that ensues. The main character is Hasekura Rokuemon.

1980 Japanese novels
Novels set in Mexico
Novels set in the 17th century